Derek George Palmer (24 January 1928 – 20 March 2002) was an Anglican priest, most notably Archdeacon of Rochester and Canon Residential of Rochester Cathedral from 1977 to 1983.

Palmer was educated at Selwyn College, Cambridge, and Wells Theological College.  He was ordained in 1953 and began his ministry as Priest in charge of the Good Shepherd, Bristol. He held incumbencies at Hartcliffe and Christ Church, Swindon (1968 - 1977) before his time as Archdeacon; and Dronfield afterwards. He was an Honorary Chaplain to the Queen from  1990 to 1998.

Notes

1928 births
2002 deaths
People educated at Marlborough College
Alumni of Selwyn College, Cambridge
Alumni of Wells Theological College
20th-century English Anglican priests
21st-century English Anglican priests
Archdeacons of Rochester
Honorary Chaplains to the Queen